Andarum is a Ramu language of Papua New Guinea. Together with closely related Kanggape, there were about 4,000 speakers in 2000.

References

Ataitan languages
Languages of Madang Province